The 1967 ECAC Hockey Men's Ice Hockey Tournament was the 6th tournament in league history. It was played between March 7 and March 11, 1967. Quarterfinal games were played at home team campus sites, while the 'final four' games were played at the Boston Garden in Boston, Massachusetts. By reaching the championship game both, Cornell and Boston University received invitations to participate in the 1967 NCAA University Division Men's Ice Hockey Tournament.

Format
The tournament featured three rounds of play, all of which were single-elimination. The top eight teams, based on conference rankings, qualified to participate in the tournament. In the quarterfinals the first seed and eighth seed, the second seed and seventh seed, the third seed and sixth seed and the fourth seed and fifth seed played against one another. In the semifinals, the winner of the first and eighth matchup played the winner of the fourth and fifth matchup while the other two remaining teams played with the winners advancing to the championship game and the losers advancing to the third place game.

Conference standings
Note: GP = Games played; W = Wins; L = Losses; T = Ties; Pct. = Winning percentage; GF = Goals for; GA = Goals against

Bracket

Note: * denotes overtime period(s)

Quarterfinals

(1) Boston University vs. (8) Harvard

(2) Cornell vs. (7) Brown

(3) Boston College vs. (6) Clarkson

(4) St. Lawrence vs. (5) Yale

Semifinals

(1) Boston University vs. (4) St. Lawrence

(2) Cornell vs. (3) Boston College

Third Place

(3) Boston College vs. (4) St. Lawrence

Championship

(1) Boston University vs. (6) Cornell

Tournament awards

All-Tournament Team

First Team
F Mike Doran (Cornell)
F Jim Quinn (Boston University)
F Doug Ferguson* (Cornell)
D Harry Orr (Cornell)
D Brian Gilmour (Boston University)
G Ken Dryden (Cornell)
* Most Outstanding Player(s)

Second Team
F Jerry York (Boston College)
F Herb Wakabayashi (Boston University)
F Dave Ferguson (Cornell)
D Peter McLachlan (Boston University)
D Skip Stanowski (Cornell)
G Wayne Ryan (Boston University)

References

External links
ECAC Hockey
1966–67 ECAC Hockey Standings
1966–67 NCAA Standings

ECAC Hockey Men's Ice Hockey Tournament
ECAC tournament